Ralph W. Hemecker is an American director, writer, and producer. He directed episodes of the drama series Once Upon a Time and The Flash.

Career
In 2000, Hemecker founded Mythic Films, a full service feature film, TV and commercial production company. After directing Witchblade, Hemecker served as the showrunner, writer, and producer for the subsequent television series, which aired from 2000 to 2002.

Hemecker has directed episodes of Renegade, Dead at 21, Millennium, Numb3rs, V, Blue Bloods, and Nikita. He directed 21 episodes of the ABC fantasy/drama series Once Upon a Time.

In 2014, he joined as a recurring director on The CW superhero series The Flash. He directed the first-season episode, "Tricksters", where Mark Hamill reprised the role of the titular supervillain. He also directed the second season crossover episode with Arrow, "Legends of Today". In the third season, Hemecker returned to direct the second episode of the season, "Paradox".

Filmography

Television credits

References

External links

American film directors
American television directors
American television producers
American television writers
American male television writers
Living people
Place of birth missing (living people)
Year of birth missing (living people)